Dan Sîrbu (born 22 April 2003) is a Romanian professional footballer who plays as a centre back for Liga I side Farul Constanța.

Club career

Farul Constanța
He made his league debut on 27 February 2022 in Liga I match against FCSB.

Career statistics

Club

References

External links
 
 

2003 births
Living people
Romanian footballers
Romania youth international footballers
Association football midfielders
Liga I players
Liga III players
FC Viitorul Constanța players
FCV Farul Constanța players
Sportspeople from Galați